Chudley may refer to:

People
Will Chudley (born 1988), English rugby union player
Lloyd Chudley Alexander (1924—2007), American author

Syndromes
Chudley-Mccullough syndrome
Smith–Fineman–Myers syndrome (also known as Chudley–Lowry syndrome)

See also
Chudleigh (disambiguation)

Disambiguation pages with given-name-holder lists
Disambiguation pages with surname-holder lists